This is a list of electoral results for the Electoral division of Millner in Northern Territory elections.

Members for Millner

Election results

Elections in the 1970s

 The number of votes each individual Independent received is unknown.

 Preferences were not distributed.

Elections in the 1980s

Elections in the 1990s

Elections in the 2000s

References

Northern Territory electoral results by district